NRK1 (pronounced as "NRK en" or "- ein") is the Norwegian Broadcasting Corporation's (NRK) main television channel.

History 
Test broadcasts started on 12 January 1954, regular test broadcasts started on 13 April 1958 and regular broadcasts started on 20 August 1960. It is Norway's oldest and largest television channel and was the country's only free-to-air television channel until the launch of TV 2 in 1992.

The channel was formerly known as NRK Fjernsynet (NRK Television), but its name was colloquially abbreviated as just NRK or Fjernsynet ("the television"). On 1 September 1996, the channel renamed as NRK1 due to the launch of NRK2 that day.

Programming 
Besides its own productions, the channel also broadcasts co-productions with other Nordic countries through Nordvision, as well as a significant amount of programmes from English-speaking countries like the United States, United Kingdom, and Australia, all in the original language with Norwegian subtitles. Its news programme is called Dagsrevyen.

In 2010, NRK HD was launched, broadcasting at 720p. NRK HD was set to make its first official broadcasting from the 2010 Vancouver Olympics opening ceremony, but the first HD broadcast was Super Bowl XLIV, on 7 February 2010.

Logos and identities

See also 
 Lilyhammer
 Norsemen
 NRK1 regional services

References

External links 
 NRK TV overview, all television channels (NRK, official website) 
 NRK1 Live TV on internet 
 NRK TV history  
 Program overview for Norwegian television channels 
 About NRK 

NRK
Television channels in Norway
Television channels and stations established in 1954
1954 establishments in Norway